Zygaena loyselis  is a species of moth in the Zygaenidae family. It is found in the Atlas Mountains (in Morocco, Algeria, Tunisia).

In Seitz (1913): 
Z. loyselis Oberth. (4f g) has always a rosy red collar, and a narrow but bright rosy red abdominal belt; otherwise resembling favonia, but most specimens considerably larger. Normally the red basal area of loyselis separated into 2—3 longitudinal spots, and the apical patch into 2 red rounded spots. If the spots are more or less confluent, we haveab. confluens Dziurz.

References

loyselis
Moths described in 1876